"The Little Black Bag" is a science fiction novelette by American  Cyril M. Kornbluth, first published in the July 1950 edition of Astounding Science Fiction. It is a predecessor of sorts to the story "The Marching Morons".  It won the 2001 Retroactive Hugo Award for Best Novelette (of 1951) and was also recognized as the 13th best all-time short science fiction story in October and November 1971 Analog Science Fact & Fiction poll, The Reference Library review article, tied with "Microcosmic God" by Theodore Sturgeon. It was among the stories selected in 1970 by the Science Fiction Writers of America as one of the best science fiction short stories published before the creation of the Nebula Awards. As such, it was published in The Science Fiction Hall of Fame Volume One, 1929-1964.

It was the basis of episodes (using the same title) in three television series: Tales of Tomorrow in 1952, Out of the Unknown in 1969 (which now only exists partially) and Night Gallery in 1970.

Plot summary
In the future, humanity has split into a small minority of supergeniuses and those of normal intelligence, and a much larger group of dimwits, as described in "The Marching Morons". The geniuses masquerade as assistants to the morons, the better to covertly manage them and keep them out of trouble.

A "physicist" goads his minder into giving him specifications for a time machine. The faux physicist builds it, and uses it to send a "doctor" friend's highly automated medical kit into the past (our present), where it is found by Dr. Full, a physician who has succumbed to alcoholism and fallen to the bottom level of society.  At first attributing its advanced properties and unfamiliar components to medical advances made since he last practiced, he uses it to heal a seriously injured young child. The patient's cynical eighteen-year-old sister, Angie, discovers the patent application date on one of the instruments (2450) and is quick to grasp the financial opportunities. She blackmails Full into taking her on as a partner.

The responsibility helps Full recover from his alcoholism, and he is soon running a respectable clinic with help from Angie, curing mankind's ills with amazing success, although the patients are blindfolded during procedures to protect the secret of the futuristic equipment. While Full is content to simply treat injuries and illnesses, Angie wants to specialize in the more lucrative plastic surgery. When Angie learns that Full intends to turn the bag over to the medical establishment for the good of humanity, she grabs it and tries to leave. In the ensuing scuffle, the instruments spill out. Without thinking, Angie stabs Full with a surgical knife meant for amputations, killing him. Initially shocked, she quickly recovers and disposes of the body using a small incinerating device used for tumors. Full had taught Angie how to use the kit and allowed her to practice with its contents, so she sees no obstacle to continuing to treat rich patients.

Her first patient sees the sharp instruments and balks at the prospect of surgery. To reassure her, Angie demonstrates their safety by running a scalpel through her arm without harm. Still unconvinced, the client requests another test. Back in the future, a technician notes the bag has been used for murder and deactivates its advanced functions, destroying many of the contents. Angie runs what has just become an ordinary scalpel across her own throat, with fatal results.

References

External links

 https://www.imdb.com/title/tt0717072/ episode of Tales of Tomorrow, aired 30 May 1952.
 https://www.imdb.com/title/tt0280876/ episode of Out of the Unknown, aired 25 February 1969.
 https://www.imdb.com/title/tt0660832/ episode of Night Gallery, starring Burgess Meredith, aired 23 December 1970.

1950 short stories
Short stories by Cyril M. Kornbluth
Hugo Award for Best Novelette winning works
Works originally published in Analog Science Fiction and Fact
Short fiction about time travel